Włodzimierz Staszak (born 20 May 1948) is a retired Polish runner who specialized in the 1500 metres.

He finished eighth at the 1973 European Indoor Championships, and won the bronze medal at the 1974 European Indoor Championships. He became Polish indoor champion in the 1500 metres in 1973.

References

1948 births
Living people
Polish male middle-distance runners
Place of birth missing (living people)
Zawisza Bydgoszcz athletes
20th-century Polish people